Kreisreform Sachsen-Anhalt 2007 (or Kreisgebietsreform 2007) is a law in  Saxony-Anhalt, Germany that came into effect on July 1, 2007, which outlines a reform of the districts of Saxony-Anhalt. It reduced the districts from 24 to 14. Nine new districts were created by amalgamating existing districts, while the rural districts of Altmarkkreis Salzwedel and Stendal as well as the urban districts of Halle and Magdeburg were untouched.

Districts (as of 1 July 2007)

Further developments
The Salzland district Parliament decided to change the name to Salzlandkreis.
On 16 July 2007 the Burgenland district Parliament decided to change the name again to Burgenlandkreis, which came into effect on the 1 August 2007.

References

External links 
 Statistisches Landesamt Sachsen-Anhalt 
 Complete breakdown (2.1MB)  Statistisches Landesamt Sachsen-Anhalt
 Salzlandkreis 
 Fusion of Dessau-Roßlau 
 Fusion of Dessau-Roßlau 

Law of Germany
2007 in Germany
2007 in law
21st century in Saxony-Anhalt